Twenty is a compilation album by British electronic dance music act Chicane, released on 29 July 2016 through Modena Records The album is in two parts; the first half being a remix album, and the second being a greatest hits compilation. However another greatest hits album, The Best of Chicane: 1996–2008, has been previously released. Exclusive songs are featured on the album, including its single "Carry Me Home" (with Steve Edwards), a rework of the song of the same name by gospel house group Gloworm. The album's title refers to Chicane's twentieth anniversary in the music industry.

Background
As with his previous greatest hits album, "No Ordinary Morning", "Don't Give Up" and "Saltwater" are re-recordings, as the original recordings were still owned by Xtravaganza and were unable to be licensed for this compilation due to a dispute between Chicane and the label's boss Alex Gold, dated back to 2002. Chicane's previous recordings which had been distributed by Edel Records in 1996/1997 are featured in their original form as Xtravaganza lost the rights to them.

Track listing

CD & digital download

Charts

References

2016 compilation albums
Chicane (musician) albums